The Latin Grammy Award for Best Contemporary Tropical Album is an honor presented annually at the Latin Grammy Awards, a ceremony that recognizes excellence and promotes a wider awareness of cultural diversity and contributions of Latin recording artists in the United States and internationally. According to the category description guide for the 13th Latin Grammy Awards, the award is for vocal or instrumental contemporary tropical albums containing at least 51 percent playing time of newly recorded material. It is awarded to solo artists or groups; if the work is a tribute album or collection of live performances, the award is presented only to the directors or producers.

The category included cumbia and vallenato recordings until the introduction of Best Cumbia/Vallenato Album at the 7th Annual Latin Grammy Awards in 2006. In January 2008, the award for Best Merengue Album was discontinued due to a shortage of submissions, resulting in merengue recordings becoming eligible in the Best Contemporary Tropical Album category. The accolade for Best Contemporary Tropical Album was first presented to Colombia singer Carlos Vives at the 3rd Annual Latin Grammy Awards in 2002 for his album Déjame Entrar (2001). Vives holds the record for the most victories, with six.

Winners and nominees

2000s

2010s

2020s

Notes 
 Each year is linked to the article about the Latin Grammy Awards held that year.
 Showing the name of the performer and the nominated album

References

General
  Note: User must select the "Tropical Field" category as the genre under the search feature.

Specific

External links 

Official website of the Latin Grammy Awards

 
Awards established in 2002
2002 establishments in the United States
Contemporary Tropical Album